SpaceX CRS-28, also known as SpX-28, is a Commercial Resupply Service mission to the International Space Station (ISS) scheduled to be launched in June 2023. The mission is contracted by NASA and will be flown by SpaceX using a Cargo Dragon. This will be the seventh flight for SpaceX under NASA's CRS Phase 2.

Cargo Dragon 

SpaceX plans to reuse the Cargo Dragons up to five times. The Cargo Dragon will launch without SuperDraco abort engines, without seats, cockpit controls and the life support system required to sustain astronauts in space. Dragon 2 improves on Dragon 1 in several ways, including lessened refurbishment time, leading to shorter periods between flights.

The new Cargo Dragon capsules under the NASA CRS Phase 2 contract will land east of Florida in the Atlantic Ocean.

Payload 
NASA contracted for the CRS-28 mission from SpaceX and therefore determines the primary payload, date of launch, and orbital parameters for the Cargo Dragon.

ISS Roll Out Solar Arrays (iROSA)

Third pair of new solar arrays using XTJ Prime space solar cells. They will be delivered to the station in the unpressurized trunk of the SpaceX Cargo Dragon  spacecraft.

The installation of these new solar arrays will require two spacewalks: one to prepare the worksite with a modification kit and another to install the new panel.

Research 
The new experiments arriving at the orbiting laboratory will inspire future scientists and explorers, and provide valuable insight for researchers.

NASA Glenn Research Center studies:

== CubeSats ==
CubeSats planned for this mission:

Northern SPIRIT

Three CubeSat satellites were built in part of the Northern Space Program for Innovative Research and Integrated Training (Northern SPIRIT). These CubeSats were constructed as a collaboration between Yukon University, Aurora Research Institute in the Northwest Territories, and the University of Alberta. This initiative is supported by the Canadian Space Agency (CSA) as a part of the Canadian CubeSat Project (CCP). In addition to what's below, all three satellites have a primary goal of gathering magnetic field data of the ionosphere to study small scale field-aligned currents.

 Ex-Alta 2:  A 3U CubeSat built by students from the University of Alberta's student organization AlbertaSat. Ex-Alta 2's primary mission is to obtain scientific data for wildfire research and prevention. Additionally, Ex-Alta 2 was designed to promote the long-term goal of a fully open-sourced cube satellite, and the development of the Albertan commercial space industry. 
 AuroraSAT and YukonSat: 2U CubeSats built by students from the Aurora Research Institute and Yukon university in collaboration with the University of Alberta. One of the two primary missions is the Northern Images Mission, which will display art on a small screen on the satellite, and then take images of this art from space with the Earth in the background. Children across Northern Canada will have the opportunity to have their artwork featured. The Northern Voices Mission will transmit and broadcast recordings of Northern Canadian stories and perspectives in amateur radio bands across the world.

See also 

 Uncrewed spaceflights to the International Space Station

References 

SpaceX Dragon 2
SpaceX payloads contracted by NASA
Supply vehicles for the International Space Station
2023 in spaceflight
2023 in the United States